Patricia Montero (born 22 August 1997) is a Puerto Rican female volleyball player.

She is part of the Puerto Rico women's national volleyball team. 
She participated in the 2013 FIVB World Grand Prix.

She played for the University of Kansas.

References

External links 
 player info FIVB

1997 births
Living people
Puerto Rican women's volleyball players
Place of birth missing (living people)
Sportspeople from Ponce, Puerto Rico
Wing spikers
Kansas Jayhawks women's volleyball players